Crossley Hospital may refer to: 

 Crossley Hospital, Ancoats, a Salvation Army Maternity hospital in Ancoats, Manchester
 Crossley Hospital East, a tuberculosis sanatorium in Delamere Forest, Cheshire, also known as the Manchester Sanitorium
 Crossley Hospital West, a tuberculosis sanatorium in Delamere Forest, Cheshire, also known as the Liverpool Sanitorium